The Embassy of Iraq in Washington, D.C. is the diplomatic mission of the Republic of Iraq to the United States.  The embassy is located at 3421 Massachusetts Avenue, Northwest, in the Embassy Row neighborhood, near the United States Naval Observatory.

Offices

The consular section of the embassy is located in the former chancery at 1801 P Street, N.W., near Dupont Circle. This building also houses the embassy's commercial office, cultural office, as well as military attaché office.

See also

 Embassy of the United States, Baghdad
 Foreign relations of Iraq
 Iraq–United States relations
 List of diplomatic missions in Washington, D.C.
 List of diplomatic missions of Iraq

References

External links

 Official website
wikimapia

Iraq
Washington, D.C.
Iraq–United States relations
Iraq